The 2004 Shakey's V-League (SVL) season was the first season of the Shakey's V-League. Founded in 2004 and organized by Sports Vision Management Group, Inc. (Sports Vision). The league began as the Shakey's V-League, a women's collegiate league with teams coming from the University Athletic Association of the Philippines (UAAP), the National Collegiate Athletic Association (NCAA) and the Cebu Schools Athletic Foundation (CESAFI), and among others.

First conference

Participating teams

Final round 
 All series are best-of-3

 Finals

Final standings

Individual awards

Second conference 
The Shakey's V-League 1st season 2nd conference started on November 28, 2004, at the PhilSports Arena, Pasig, Philippines, with 7 teams competing in the conference.

Participating teams

Final round 

 Final's match results
 3rd place 

|}

 Championship 

|}

Final standings

Individual awards

Venues 
 Lyceum Gym, Intramuros, Manila
 PhilSports Arena, Pasig
 Rizal Memorial Coliseum, Manila

References 

2004 in Philippine sport